Ojos de Fuego  (Eyes of Fire) is a 1995 Argentine independent short film written and directed by Jorge Gaggero.

Cast
 Erasmo Olivera as Julian
 Jorge Huertas as Comisario
 Victor Poleri as Rengo
 Eva Fernandez as Madre de Julian
 Leandro Martínez as Laucha

External links 
 

1995 films
1995 short films
1990s Spanish-language films
Argentine independent films
Argentine short films
1995 independent films
1990s Argentine films